Saleh Khan may refer to:

 Saleh Khan (1), Hirmand, a village in Iran
 Saleh Khan (2), Hirmand, a village in Iran
 Saleh Muhammad Khan, Pakistani politician